Aaag Hi Aag is 1999 Hindi language action movie directed by T L V Prasad and starring Mithun Chakraborty, Jackie Shroff, Sneha, Aloknath Dixit, Payal Malhotra, Rajiv Raj, Kiran Kumar, Laxmikant Berde.

Plot
This is the story of two men clash with underworld Dons to free society from anti social elements. Ajay and Ravi are fighting against the lawless activities of Mafia king Tiger.

Cast
Mithun Chakraborty as Inspector Ajay Singh
Jackie Shroff as Ravi
Raj Kiran as Inspector Singh
Ranjeet as Gopal Bharti
Tej Sapru as Sharma
Sneha 
Aloknath Dixit 
Payal Malhotra
Rajiv Raj
Kiran Kumar as Police Commissioner
Laxmikant Berde as Baba Bakwas Kalandar
Suresh Chatwal as J.K. - Rocky's Father
Mac Mohan as Tony

Soundtrack
Music: Babul Bose, Lyrics: Nawab Arzoo
" Aag Hi Aag Hai Paani Mein" – Vinod Rathod, Jolly Mukherjee, Richa Sharma, Tina
" Teri Chaahat Ki Kasam" – Udit Narayan, Kavita Krishnamurthy
"Jab Tera Ishq Mila" (Duet) - Udit Narayan, Alka Yagnik
" Jab Tera Ishq Mila" (Female) - Alka Yagnik
" Yeh Yeh Kya Hua" - Arun Bakshi, Alka Yagnik
"Tujhe Apna Banaaneko Waiting" - Abhijeet, Alka Yagnik

External links

References 

1999 films
1990s Hindi-language films
Mithun's Dream Factory films
Films shot in Ooty
Films scored by Babul Bose
Indian action films